The 1967 Australian Grand Prix was a motor race held over 45 laps of the 3.621 km (2.25 mi) Warwick Farm Raceway in Sydney, New South Wales, Australia on 19 February 1967. It was promoted by the Australian Automobile Racing Co. Pty. Ltd. The race, which was open to Australian National Formula and Australian 1½ Litre Formula cars, had 15 starters.

The race was the thirty-second Australian Grand Prix and the fourth round of the 1967 Tasman Series. Jackie Stewart started the race on pole in a BRM P261 and drove the race's fastest lap. Tasman Series points leader Jim Clark finished second in a Lotus 33, with Australian driver Frank Gardner third in a Repco Brabham BT16. Reigning World Champion Driver Jack Brabham finished fourth in his Repco Brabham BT23A.

In his victory presentation speech New South Wales Governor Sir Roden Cutler VC AK KCMG KCVO CBE aptly named the 1967 AGP as the "Scottish Grand Prix" after Scotsmen Jackie Stewart and Jim Clark finished 1–2.

Classification

Results as follows:

Notes
Pole position: Jackie Stewart – 1'30.8
Winner's average speed: 87.67 mph (141.08 km/h)
Fastest lap: Jackie Stewart, 1:34.4, 88.62 mph (142.61 km/h) - New Outright Record
David Langridge Trophy (resident drivers cup): Leo Geoghegan

References

External links
 Australian Grand Prix Thrills 1967 (video), www.britishpathe.com
 My Unseen 1960s Motor Races - part 4 - 1967 Australian Grand Prix (video), www.youtube.com

Grand Prix
Australian Grand Prix
Tasman Series
Motorsport at Warwick Farm
Australian Grand Prix